First National Bank Arena (originally called the Convocation Center until 2017) is a 10,038-seat multi-purpose arena located on the campus of Arkansas State University, and is home to their college basketball team, the Red Wolves.

First National Bank Arena has three separate public venues including a 217-seat Auditorium, a banquet/meeting room that can be divided into 3 smaller meeting rooms, and the main arena, which has permanent seating for 10,475. First National Bank Arena hosts hundreds of events each year in these three venues, and well over 100,000 people walk through its doors each year.

History
The first event was the Class of 1987 commencement.  Throughout the years, First National Bank Arena has been host to many superstars including George Strait, Dolly Parton, Garth Brooks, Alabama, Reba McEntire, Rascal Flatts, Taylor Swift, Keith Urban, Carrie Underwood, Jason Aldean and Eric Church in the last five years.

WWE has used First National Bank Arena for a Live Raw event. The Sun Belt Conference uses the versatile building to host the Indoor Track & Field Championships every other year.  The building is home to Arkansas State University Men's & Women's Basketball as well as Women's Volleyball.

In 2009, the weight room was upgraded. The same thing happened the following year to the locker and media rooms. There are four visitor locker rooms, as well as smaller, official locker rooms throughout the building.

In 2012, the original scoreboard and sound system (from 1987) were replaced with four 25' × 12' HD video boards and a 28-speaker sound system.  Also in 2012, an entirely new roof was installed, as well as upgrades to the Administrative Offices and Box Office.

See also
 List of NCAA Division I basketball arenas

References

External links
Official Website

Arkansas State Red Wolves men's basketball
Basketball venues in Arkansas
College basketball venues in the United States
Buildings and structures in Jonesboro, Arkansas
Sports venues completed in 1987
1987 establishments in Arkansas